Above Rocks is a town in the parish of Saint Catherine in Jamaica.

Above Rocks was populated in the early 19th century by (Roman Catholic) refugees from the Haitian revolution.
St Mary's College, a Catholic secondary school, can be found in the town of Above Rocks.

References 

Populated places in Saint Catherine Parish
Year of establishment missing
There is 3 school all Name after st mary